Ambodimanga (or Ambodimanga Ramena) is a municipality in Madagascar. It belongs to the district of Ambanja, which is a part of Diana Region. According to 2001 census the population of Ambodimanga was 5,729.

Only primary schooling is available in town. The majority 99.5% of the population are farmers.  The most important crop is coffee, while other important products are cocoa, beans and rice.  Services provide employment for 0.5% of the population.

References and notes 

Populated places in Diana Region